Thotlapalem is a village in Guntur district of the Indian state of Andhra Pradesh. It is located in Chebrolu mandal of Tenali revenue division.

References 

Villages in Guntur district